Montreal Engineering Company, later Monenco was a Canadian engineering services company operating in the energy and infrastructure utilities area.

The company became an important player in North and Latin American, and elsewhere, such as the feasibility study and design of the Diamer-Bhasha Dam, and Jebba Hydroelectric Power Station respectively. The company was also involved in the ill-fated World War 2 experiment Project Habakkuk.

History
In 1907 a department of the Royal Securities Corporation with three staff members was spun out into the Montreal Engineering Company Ltd. In 1919 the company became part of the portfolio of financier Izaak Walton Killam whose expansion and acquisition of electrical utilities and other industrial concerns grew the company. After Killam's death in 1955 the company was bought by its senior employees.

After 1964 the company diversified from its core electrical power business, it became a public company in 1969 and was renamed Monenco Inc..

In 1992 the company was acquired by AGRA Inc. AGRA Monenco  was subsequently acquired by AMEC in 2000.

References

Further reading

Construction and civil engineering companies of Canada
Construction and civil engineering companies established in 1907
Canadian companies established in 1907
Companies based in Montreal